Manuel Alejandro Tarrazo Lama (born 1989) is a fashion designer, TV presenter and actor from the Dominican Republic.

He is the son of Ángel Tarrazo Díaz, a Spanish shoemaker from Grado (Asturias), and Afife Gloria Lama Tactuk, the daughter of Julio Lama Handar (whose parents were the founders of Plaza Lama) and Mirtha Tactuk, both born to Lebanese parents.

In 2006, Manuel Tarrazo acted in the film La Tragedia Llenas: Un Código 666, based on actual events, playing the role of José R. Llenas-Aybar, a boy from an upper middle class family who was murdered.

Tarrazo Lama studied fashion design in the Istituto Marangoni, a fashion school at Milan, Italy. Tarrazo designs footwear for both men and women. In 2009, he presented his first collection in the República Dominicana Fashion Week '09.

Career 

Television
"Aquí Se Habla Español" (201?–present)

Filmography

References 

Living people
1989 births
Dominican Republic fashion designers
Shoe designers
Dominican Republic television presenters
Dominican Republic male film actors
Dominican Republic people of Asturian descent
Dominican Republic people of Lebanese descent
People from Santo Domingo
21st-century male actors
Dominican Republic male television actors
White Dominicans